Bangladesh has experienced terrorism in the past conducted by a number of different organizations. In the past, both ISIL and other terrorist organizations had claimed to be active in the country however, the Bangladeshi government believes that they mainly operated through local affiliates, before being neutralised by security forces.

History
The first Bangladeshi Islamist factions emerged in 1989, when a network of 30 different factions was established and expanded in the following years. The main goal of most Islamist groups in Bangladesh is to create a separate Islamic state, or to govern Bangladesh according to Sharia law. Islamist groups have conducted operations against the ruling party's corruptions in the country. Islamic groups are alleged to be terrorists for political interests.

Timeline

1999 
 On 18 January 1999, Harkat-ul Jihad al-Islami Bangladesh carried out at assassination attempt on Shamsur Rahman.
 On 6 March 1999, bomb attack on Bangladesh Udichi Shilpigoshthi in Jessore killed 10.
 15 March 1999 bomb attack on the home of Mohibur Rahman Manik, Awami League member of parliament, killing two.
 On 8 December 1999, an Ahmadi mosque was bombed, killing 8.

2001 
 On 20 January 2001, a communist party of Bangladesh rally was bombed, which resulted in the death of five people and the wounding of 70 others.
 On 14 April 2001, 10 people were killed in a series of bombings perpetrated by Harkat-ul-Jihad al-Islami.
 On 1 June 2001, 10 people were killed in Gopalganj Roman Catholic church bombing.
 On 16 June 2001, a rally of Bangladesh Awami League in bombed in Narayanganj.
 On 23 September 2001, a rally of Bangladesh Awami League in Bagerhat was bombed.
 On 26 September 2001, a rally of Bangladesh Awami League was bombed in Sunamganj, kills 4.
 On 16 November 2001, the death of Gopal Krishna Muhuri took place in Chittagong.

2002 
 On 6 December 2002, 27 people were killed in coordinated bombing of cinema halls in Mymensingh.
 On 28 September 2002, 3 people were killed and 100 injured in bombing of a cinema hall and circus in Satkhira.

2003 
 On 17 January 2003, bomb blast at a shrine fair in Tangail.
 On 1 March 2003, a police sergeant was killed in a bomb attack in Khulna.
 On 11 March 2003, two police constables were killed in a bomb attack.
 On 12 March 2003, a police subedar was killed in a bomb attack in Khulna city.
 On 6 September 2003, Bangladesh Awami League leader killed in bomb attack.

2004 
 On 12 January 2004, bombing of Shajalal Shrine kills 12.
On 13 January 2004, a bomb attack on Fazlur Rahman, joint secretary of Sharsha upazila unit of the Awami League, in Benapol kills him and injures six.
On 13 January 2004,, three people were killed in a bomb attack on Shah Jalal Dargah.
On 13 January 2004, a bomb was thrown on an on duty traffic sergeant which failed to explode in Moilapota intersection, Khulna.
 On 15 January 2004, Manik Chandra Saha, journalist, killed in terror attack.
 On 24 January 2004, a police camp was bombed in Bagerhat injuring three police officers.
 On 20 February 2004, movie house at Rupsha Upazila was bombed injuring 4.
 On 4 March 2004, a Bangladesh Awami League leader was killed in a bomb attack in Bagerhat  and one Awami League leader was assassinated in Narayanganj.
On 4 August 2004, a bomb attack on  Rangmahal Cinema and at Monika Cinema in Sylhet killed one and injured ten.
 On 21 August 2004, HUJI militants perpetrated a grenade attack on an Awami League rally in Dhaka, resulting in 24 deaths and over 300 injuries.
 On 24 December 2004, Rajshahi University Professor Mohammad Yunus was killed in an attack by JMB.

2005 
 On 17 August 2005, a total of 500 bombs exploded in 300 locations covering most of the territory of Bangladesh, 2 people were killed and 50 wounded in the incident. Jama'atul Mujahideen Bangladesh later claimed responsibility for the bombings.
 On 3 October 2005, Chittagong court, Chandpur Court and Laxmipur court were attacked with bombs.
 On 14 November 2005, JMB kills two judges in bomb attack in Jhalaikathi.
 On 29 November 2005 suicide attack on Gazipur Courthouse.
 On 29 November 2005 Chittagong court house bombed.
 On 8 December 2005 suicide bomb attack on Netrokona udichi festival.

2009
 On 30 October 2009, three people were killed in a bomb attack on Shah Jalal Dargah.

2014 
 On 17 September 2014, acting on a tip, Rapid Action Battalion discovered and dismantled a weapons and explosives storage facility located in the Satchhari forest, Chunarughat Upazila, Habiganj. 112 rocket launchers and 14 sacks of explosive material were confiscated during the operation.
 On 18 September 2014, police arrested 7 JMB terrorists, including a top commander Abdullah Al Tasnim, in the Landing Station Port area. The militants intended to utilize 10 kilogrammes of liquid explosives, in a number of terrorist acts throughout the country, in order to establish cooperation with ISIL.
 On 1 November 2014, a Rapid Action Battalion operation led to the capture of JMB's main coordinator Abdun Nur as well as four other militants. IED components were also seized.

2016 
 On 15 March 2016, ISIL claimed responsibility for murdering a Muslim preacher in Bangladesh.
 On 22 March 2016, unidentified attackers hacked a Christian convert to death in northern Bangladesh. A day after, ISIL claimed responsibility for the attack.
 On 7 April 2016, a secular blogger was hacked to death by Islamists who claimed to be part of al-Qaeda.
 On 23 April 2016, a university professor was hacked to death on his way to work in northern Bangladesh. Without any evidence, ISIL claimed responsibility for the attack.
 On 25 April 2016, al-Qaeda terrorists hacked LGBTQ activist, Xulhaz Mannan, and his friend to death in his apartment.
 On 30 April 2016, a Hindu tailor was hacked to death in his store. ISIL claimed responsibility for the attack. On the next day, Bangladesh authorities arrested three ISIL suspects for the murder.
 On 21 May 2016, a homeopathic doctor was hacked to death in Bangladesh. ISIL claimed responsibility for the attack.
 On 1 July 2016, militants hacked a Buddhist farmer to death in Bandarban district. Mong Shwe Lung Marma, 55, was also vice president of the Bangladesh Awami League. ISIL fighters claimed responsibility for the murder.
 On 1 July 2016, five attackers opened fire inside the Holey Artisan Bakery located in the posh Gulshan neighbourhood, which is also part of the diplomatic enclave of Dhaka. Around 22 civilians and 2 police officers were killed. All five attackers were neutralised by the commando units of the Bangladesh Armed Forces, who stormed the building.

2017 
 14 March - A Muslim Sufi spiritual leader and his daughter were shot and hacked to death by unknown militants in northern Bangladesh.
 17 March- 2017 Dhaka RAB camp suicide bombing: A suicide bomber blew himself up inside an under construction camp of the anti-crime Rapid Action Battalion, mildly injuring two security personnel.
 24 March - A suicide bomber blew himself up outside the police check-post, which was located on the road leading to the Hazrat Shahjalal International Airport causing no injuries to other people. ISIL claimed the attack.
 25 March - 2017 South Surma Upazila bombings: A suicide bombing killed four civilians, two police officers and wounded around 40 during a security forces raid on a suspected terrorist hideout in South Surma Upazila, Bangladesh. ISIL claimed responsibility. Four militants were also killed.

2019
 On 29 June, acting on a tipoff, Rapid Action Battalion (RAB) arrested five members of banned militant outfit Ansar Al Islam (AAI) from Belpukur area in Puthia Upazila of Rajshahi. RAB recovered a pistol, 24 crude bombs, five bullets, two magazines, 10 jihadi books and eight organisational notebooks from them.

See also
 Chittagong Hill Tracts conflict
 ISIL in Bangladesh
 Naxalite–Maoist insurgency
 Attacks by Islamic extremists in Bangladesh

References

 
1990s in Bangladesh
2000s in Bangladesh
2010s in Bangladesh